Formed in the year 2000 to support its members, the Arizona Opera Orchestra Musicians Association (AZOOMA) is an organization of highly trained and diversified music professionals from the Arizona Opera Orchestra. The majority of orchestra members reside in Phoenix, Tucson and Flagstaff, but some travel from as far as New York, California, Kansas, New Mexico, and Vermont to be members of this orchestra.

As with other major metropolitan areas, in both Phoenix and Tucson there are separate and dedicated orchestras for each musical genre: symphonic music and opera. The orchestra performs in Phoenix Symphony Hall and in Tucson Convention Center Music Hall.

AZOOMA serves as a representative body for the Arizona Opera Orchestra musicians and under its bylaws operates audition and grievance committees, a contract negotiation committee, an outreach committee and Regional Orchestra Players Association representatives. Beyond this, the organization was created to promote and support Arizona Opera musicians and their activities, and to raise awareness and reach out to the community in support of the Arizona Opera and its programs.

AZOOMA is affiliated with the American Federation of Musicians (a branch of the AFL-CIO) and most members claim to have earned bachelors, masters, and doctoral degrees from some of the world's finest conservatories and universities, including:

Arizona State University
University of Arizona
Northern Arizona University
Northwestern University
Indiana University
Manhattan School of Music
Cincinnati Conservatory
Eastman School of Music
Oberlin Conservatory

Other statistics:

95% of the orchestra members have a college degree 
84% of the orchestra members have more than one college degree 
1/3 of the orchestra members have a doctoral degree

The organization operates under a Collective Bargaining Agreement with the Arizona Opera and American Federation of Musicians Local 586.

Footnotes

External links 
Arizona Opera Musicians Association
Arts Addict Review
Arizona Opera
City of Phoenix: Arizona Opera
Arizona Opera: Artistic Ensembles

American Federation of Musicians
2000 establishments in Arizona
Trade unions established in 2000